James Nowiczewski is a Sound Recordist working in Sydney, Australia.

His credits include the multi-award-winning Better Homes and Gardens, The Biggest Loser, Atlas and many other broadcast productions.

He is a frequent lecturer on production sound, reviews and tests broadcast products, and writes for industry magazines including Digital Media World.

References

Australian audio engineers
Living people
Year of birth missing (living people)